Boga (also known as Boka) is an Afro-Asiatic language spoken in the Adamawa State of Nigeria.

Notes 

Biu-Mandara languages
Languages of Nigeria